Merchlar is an augmented reality (AR) company based in Montreal, NYC and Paris. It develops mobile applications using AR and VR technology for clients, including: Desjardins Group, Ubisoft, and Mohegan Sun. In addition to its agency, Merchlar has a R&D department that creates patented AR technology.

History 

Monumental Technologies was founded in December 2009 by Canadian Entrepreneur and AR&VR pioneer Awane Jones, his brother Bassil Silim-Jones and Eric St-Pierre. They decided to create a mobile music community – the world's first augmented reality mobile platform for artists to create their own application at zero cost.

In 2011,  the company evolved into Merchlar (the first augmented reality company in Canada), a digital agency that powers augmented reality & virtual reality and offers interactive marketing solutions to companies such as Universal Pictures, Twitter, Alliance Films, Bell, Desjardins Group, Montreal International Jazz Festival, University of Maryland, and World Conference on Information Technology (WCIT).

One year after the agency was formed, Contest of Quebec Entrepreneurs named Merchlar Best New Technology Company in April and granted the company Award/Coup de Coeur Contest in the following May. In June, Awane Jones and Bassil Silim Jones were selected by the Canadian Youth Business Foundation (CYBF) to represent the official Canadian delegation at the G20 Young Entrepreneur Summit (G20 YES) in Mexico City.

Since 2010, Merchlar created over 100 AR/VR solutions for its clients globally. Through the front camera lens of a smart device, users are able to use their cell phones or digital device to scan their surroundings and find out live information on the spot.

Some of Merchlar Augmented Reality projects:
Stanford University Museum + Sid Lee
JP Morgan – Augmented Reality
Ubisoft – Augmented Reality
Aldo – Little Burgundy
Manulife – Augmented Reality
Django – Augmented Reality
BAYER – Augmented Reality
Hunger Games – Augmented Reality
Toyota – Augmented Reality
Airport of Montreal – Augmented Reality
Desjardins – Augmented Reality
Montreal Jazz Fest – Augmented Reality

References 

Companies based in Montreal
Companies based in New York City
2010 establishments in Quebec
Marketing companies established in 2010
Augmented reality
Augmented reality applications
Advertising agencies of Canada